The Baden-Wuerttemberg Cooperative State University Loerrach (DHBW-Loerrach) was founded in 1981 as Berufsakademie Lörrach. It offers workplace-focused, cooperative degree courses. This means that students alternate between learning the theory at school and applying it on the job in a three-months rhythm. Besides Loerrach, seven other schools of cooperative education and three branch campuses were founded in Baden-Wuerttemberg since the beginning of 1974. 

The German state of Baden-Wuerttemberg has changed the school’s legal status on March 1, 2009. The union of the merged eight institutions with 11 campuses is now named Baden-Württemberg Cooperative State University. It is a legal entity of public law and simultaneously a state institution. By 2009 the combined student enrollment across all 11 campuses had reached more than 25,000 students. More than 90,000 graduated alumni have been educated in more than 8,000 cooperating companies.

About 2,000 students are enrolled at the DHBW Loerrach. It runs a faculty of business and a faculty of engineering and offers 17 different business and technical fields of study. All programs are intensive and full-time degree courses (accredited with 210 ECTS). 

In most of the courses students graduate after three years with one of the following degrees:
 Bachelor of Engineering (B.Eng.)
 Bachelor of Arts (B.A.)
 Bachelor of Science (B.Sc.)

Master courses  offered in 
 Health Care Management
 Human Resource Management
 Logistics Management
 Business Management (Start October 2011)

The DHBW Loerrach - situated in the triangle between Germany, Switzerland and France – offers two trinational courses in cooperation with the Université de Haute Alsace in Colmar and Mulhouse and the UASN-Switzerland in Basle and Muttenz. Students graduate from these courses after three and a half years and receive a degree from all three participating schools. The lectures are held in German, French and English.

The DHBW Loerrach cooperates with the Steinbeis Foundation Stuttgart and the following international universities:
Africa
 Durban University of Technology, South Africa
Cape Peninsula University of Technology, South Africa
 Vaal University of Technology, South Africa
North America
 Georgian College Toronto, Canada
 University of Ottawa, Canada
 University of Victoria, Canada
 University of Waterloo, Canada
 Northwestern Michigan College, USA
 University of California in Santa Barbara, USA
 Asia
 Beijing Wuzi University, China
 TEDC Bandung, Indonesia
Australia
 Royal Melbourne Institute of Technology, Australia
Europe
 University of Cergy-Pontoise, France
 Université de Haute-Alsace, France
 INSEEC Bordeaux, France
 Institute of Technology Tralee, Ireland
 Università dell’Insubria Varese / Como, Italy
 Università Politecnica delle Marche Ancona, Italy
 Savonia Polytechnic, Kuopio, Finland
 Ventspils College, Latvia
 Hogeschool Zeeland, Vlissingen, Netherlands
 FH Joanneum Graz, Austria
 The Polish Open University Warsaw, Poland
 Poznan School of Banking, Poland
 Politehnica University of Timișoara, Romania
 University of Applied Sciences Northwestern Switzerland
 Europäische Wirtschaftsakademie Madrid, Spain
 Universidad de Castilla-La Mancha Albacete, Spain
 Universidad Europea de Madrid, Spain
 Brno University of Technology, Czech Republic
 Trakya University, Edirne, Turkey
 Széchenyi István University Györ, Hungary
 Istanbul Arel University, Turkey
The school is a member in the World Association for Cooperative Education (WACE), the World Universities Congress and in the Balkan Universities Network.

Notable professors and alumni 
 Hagen Pfundner (born 1960), German pharmacist and Chairman of the Board of DHBW Loerrach

External links
 Baden-Württemberg Cooperative State University Loerrach

References

Baden-Württemberg Cooperative State University
Universities and colleges in Baden-Württemberg
1981 establishments in West Germany
Educational institutions established in 1981
Buildings and structures in Lörrach (district)